Qanlikól district (Karakalpak: Қанлыкөл районы, Qanlıkól) is a district in the Republic of Karakalpakstan. The seat lies at the urban-type settlement Qanlikól.

The district consists of one town Qanlıkól and seven rural councils Arzimbet qum, Beskópir, Jańa qala, Bostan, Kosjap, Nawriz, Qanlıkól.

References

Karakalpakstan
Districts of Uzbekistan